Baltard may refer to:

People
Victor Baltard, a French architect of the 19th century
Louis-Pierre Baltard, Victor Baltard's architect father

Places
Baltard townland in Ballard, County Clare, Ireland
Pavillon Baltard, surviving part of the Les Halles designed by Victor Baltard